"Absolute" is the eighth single released by British pop band Scritti Politti, released on 29 May 1984 by Virgin Records in the UK. It later appeared on the studio album Cupid & Psyche 85 (released in June 1985) and was produced by Arif Mardin.

Following on from their breakthrough hit "Wood Beez (Pray Like Aretha Franklin)", "Absolute" peaked at No. 17 on the UK Singles Chart. It also peaked at No. 10 on the Dutch Single Top 100.

Track listing
7" single
A: "Absolute" – 3:52
B: "Absolute" (Version) – 5:08 (an edit of the "Version" which appears on the 12")

12" single
A: "Absolute" – 4:16
B: "Absolute" (Version) – 6:10

Charts

References

External links
 

Scritti Politti songs
Songs written by Green Gartside
1984 songs
Virgin Records singles
Warner Records singles
1984 singles
Song recordings produced by Arif Mardin